Tony is a 1957 Columbia US album (CL938) and Philips UK album (BBL 7138) re-titled "Tony Bennett Showcase", by singer Tony Bennett It reached number 14 on the Billboard album chart in 1957.

Track listing
"It Had to Be You" (Isham Jones, Gus Kahn) - 2:58
"You Can Depend on Me" (Charlie Carpenter, Louis Dunlap, Earl Hines) - 2:14
"I'm Just a Lucky So-and-So" (Mack David, Duke Ellington) - 3:29
"Taking a Chance on Love" (Vernon Duke, Ted Fetter, John Latouche) - 2:09
"These Foolish Things" (Harry Link, Holt Marvell, Jack Strachey) - 3:28
"I Can't Give You Anything But Love, Baby" (Dorothy Fields, Jimmy McHugh) - 2:37
"Boulevard of Broken Dreams" (Al Dubin, Harry Warren) - 2:32
"I'll Be Seeing You" (Sammy Fain, Irving Kahal) - 2:48
"Always" (Irving Berlin) - 2:59
"Love Walked In" (George Gershwin, Ira Gershwin) - 2:00
"Lost in the Stars" (Maxwell Anderson, Kurt Weill) - 3:25
"Without a Song" (Edward Eliscu, Billy Rose, Vincent Youmans) - 2:48

Tracks recorded on June 6 (#11), September 11 (#1-4), September 12 (#5, 8, 10, 12), September 13 (#6-7, 9), 1956.

Personnel
Tony Bennett - vocals
Orchestra conducted by Ray Conniff (#1-10 & 12) and Percy Faith (#11)
Gil Evans - arranger
A. Epstein, A. Howard, Bernard Kaufman, J. Palmer, E. Powell, F. Schwartz, Wolf Taninbaum, W. Versaci, Stan Webb, Milt Yaner - r
Phil Bodner - alto sax, tenor sax, cl
Peter Pumiglio - alto sax, cl
Billy Butterfield, Bernie Glow, Dale McMickle, Jimmy Nottingham, Ernie Royal, Doc Severinsen - trumpet
Robert Alexander, Larry Altpeter, Albert Godlis, Urbie Green, T. Mitchell, Jack Satterfield - trombone
Dick Hyman, Bernie Leighton - piano
D. Arnone, Al Caiola, Chuck Wayne - guitar
I. Cusikoff, Lucien Schmidt, Alan Schuman - vc
Frank Carroll - bass
H. Breuer, William Exiner, M. Grupp - drums
Mike Stewart - backing vocals

Strings
R. Bocho, Julius Brand, Samuel Carmell, Emanuel Green, Julius Held, H. Hoffman, Leo Kruczek, Milton Lomask, Harold Melnikoff, George Ockner, Gene Orloff, Samuel Rand, Julius Schachter - violin
Sidney Brecher, Richard Dickler - viola

References

1957 albums
Tony Bennett albums
Albums arranged by Gil Evans
Columbia Records albums